The Mile-a-Minute Man is a 1926 American silent drama film directed by Jack Nelson and starring William Fairbanks, Virginia Brown Faire and George Periolat. It was produced by the independent Gotham Pictures. The plot revolves around two rival automobile producers and their respective son and daughter who are in love.

Cast
 William Fairbanks as S.P. 'Speedy' Rockett
 Virginia Brown Faire as Paul Greydon
 George Periolat as 	C.O. 'Old Ironsides' Rockett
 Jane Keckley as 	Mrs. J.P. Greydon
 George Chesebro as James Brett 
 Barney Furey as 	Joe Weeks
 Paul Dennis as Bob
 Hazel Howell as Eleanor Hoyt

References

Bibliography
 Connelly, Robert B. The Silents: Silent Feature Films, 1910-36, Volume 40, Issue 2. December Press, 1998.
 Munden, Kenneth White. The American Film Institute Catalog of Motion Pictures Produced in the United States, Part 1. University of California Press, 1997.

External links
 

1926 films
1926 drama films
1920s English-language films
American silent feature films
Silent American drama films
Films directed by Jack Nelson
American black-and-white films
Gotham Pictures films
1920s American films